Dyubek is a rural locality (a selo) and the administrative centre of Dyubeksky Selsoviet, Tabasaransky District, Republic of Dagestan, Russia. The population was 1,894 as of 2010. There are 6 streets.

Geography 
Dyubek is located 11 km north of Khuchni (the district's administrative centre) by road. Gurkhun and Khustil are the nearest rural localities.

References 

Rural localities in Tabasaransky District